Axelle is French language feminine given name, a derivative of the Scandinavian name Axel. Notable people with the name include:

 Axelle Carolyn (born 1979), Belgian filmmaker
 Axelle Crevier (born 1997), Canadian water polo player
 Axelle Dauwens (born 1990), Belgian athlete
 Axelle Étienne (born 1998), French cyclist 
 Axelle Kabou (born 1955), Cameroonian journalist
 Axelle Klinckaert (born 2000), Belgian gymnast
 Axelle Laffont (born 1970), French actress and comedian
 Axelle Lemaire (born 1974), French politician
 Axelle Mollaret (born 1992), French skyrunner and ski mountaineer
 Axelle Red (born 1968), Belgian singer-songwriter
 Axelle Renoir (born 1969), French singer and composer

See also 
 Axel (disambiguation)

French feminine given names